The Universal Data Element Framework (UDEF) was  a controlled vocabulary developed by The Open Group. It provided a framework for categorizing, naming, and indexing data. It assigned to every item of data a structured alphanumeric tag plus a controlled vocabulary name that describes the meaning of the data. This allowed relating data elements to similar elements defined by other organizations.

UDEF defined a Dewey-decimal like code for each concept. For example, an "employee number" is often used in human resource management. It has a UDEF tag a.5_12.35.8 and a controlled vocabulary description "Employee.PERSON_Employer.Assigned.IDENTIFIER".

UDEF has been superseded by the Open Data Element Framework (O-DEF).

Examples
In an application used by a hospital, the last name and first name of several people could include the following example concepts:

Patient Person Family Name – find the word “Patient” under the UDEF object “Person” and find the word “Family” under the UDEF property “Name”
Patient Person Given Name – find the word “Patient” under the UDEF object “Person” and find the word “Given” under the UDEF property “Name”
Doctor Person Family Name – find the word “Doctor” under the UDEF object “Person” and find the word “Family” under the UDEF property “Name”
Doctor Person Given Name – find the word “Doctor” under the UDEF object “Person” and find the word “Given” under the UDEF property “Name”

For the examples above, the following UDEF IDs are available:

“Patient Person Family Name” the UDEF ID is “au.5_11.10”
“Patient Person Given Name” the UDEF ID is “au.5_12.10”
“Doctor Person Family Name” the UDEF ID is “aq.5_11.10”
“Doctor Person Given Name” the UDEF ID is “aq.5_12.10”

See also
 Data integration
 ISO/IEC 11179
 National Information Exchange Model
 Metadata
 Semantic web
 Data element
 Representation term
 Controlled vocabulary

References

External links
 UDEF Project of The Open Group
 UDEF Frequently Asked Questions

Data management
Interoperability
Knowledge representation
Metadata
Open Group standards
Software that uses Motif (software)
Technical communication